Caesars Head is a mountain within Caesars Head State Park in northern Greenville County, South Carolina. The radio tower for TV station WYFF is nearby. Housing developments on top of the mountain are part of the Caesars Head census-designated place.

Climate
Caesars Head has an oceanic climate (Cfb), a rarity for South Carolina, due to its high elevation, with warm summers and mild winters.

See also 
 Caesars Head State Park

References 

Protected areas of Greenville County, South Carolina
Mountains of South Carolina
Landforms of Greenville County, South Carolina